Shakpur is a union parishad of Barura Upazila in Comilla District of Bangladesh.

History 
Shakpur Union was formerly known as Deora South Union.

Geography 
Location of Shakpur Union in the middle of Barura Upazila. It is bounded by galimpur union on the east, vauksar union on the south, adra union on the southwest, jhalam union on the west and baruda town on the north.

Area: About 3929.09 acres.

Demographics 
Out of 28690 people, 13600 are males, 14990 are females and the total number of voters is 12915.

Administration 
Shakpur union No. 7 Union Parishad under Barura Upazila. Administrative activities of this union are under Baruda police station. It is part of Comilla-6, the 256th constituency of the Jatiya Sangsad.

Education 
There are a total of 18 educational institutions including high schools, government primary schools, community primary schools and kindergartens.

References

External links
 

Coordinates not on Wikidata
Unions of Chittagong District